Dr. Ravi Shankar (born 1975) is an American poet, editor, and former literature professor at Central Connecticut State University and City University of Hong Kong and Chairman of the Asia Pacific Writers & Translators (APWT). He is the founding editor of online literary journal Drunken Boat. He has been called "a diaspora icon" by The Hindu and "one of America's finest younger poets" by former Connecticut poet laureate Dick Allen.

Career 
Shankar received his bachelor's degree from the University of Virginia, his M.F.A. in poetry from the Columbia University School of the Arts and his PhD as an international research fellow at the University of Sydney. He moved to Chester from Brooklyn, and joined the Central Connecticut State University (CCSU) as a faculty member in 2002. He was also a guest teacher of the masters program at Fairfield University. He was elected Chairman of the Connecticut Young Writers Trust in 2011. In 2014, he was promoted from the rank of associate professor to professor at CCSU. He also served as co-director of the creative writing minor at CCSU. He has appeared on PBS  and on National Public Radio. He received the University-level Trustees Research Award as a faculty member at CSUS in 2009. In the same year, he also received a fellowship award from The Connecticut Commission on Culture and Tourism and Summer Literary Seminars fellowship to Kenya. He has taught around the world including at Wesleyan University Summer Writing Conference, City University of Hong Kong, Eastern Mediterranean University in Cyprus, Sun Yat Sen University in China and his poetry has been translated into over a dozen languages, including French, German, Spanish, Hindi, Italian, Bengali, Urdu, Tamil, Slovenian, Russian, Greek, Mandarin, and Japanese.

In 1999, he founded Drunken Boat. As of 2018, he was a teacher at the New York Writers Workshop and City University of Hong Kong. He is Chairman of the Asia Pacific Writers & Translators Organization . and a Board Member of the New York Writers Workshop. He has held fellowships from Yaddo, the MacDowell Colony, Djerassi Artists Residency, Ragdale, the Blue Mountain Center, the Jentel Foundation, iPark, and he received the prestigious University of Sydney International Research Fellowship to complete work on his memoir "Correctional" and to do research on the Puritanical roots and racial demographics of mass incarceration in the United States of America.

Literary career 
Shankar's collections of poetry include A Field Guide to Southern China (2019) written with T. S. Eliot Prize winner George Szrites, The Many Uses of Mint (2018), What Else Could it Be (2015), Instrumentality (2004), a finalist for the 2005 Connecticut Book Awards, and Deepening Groove (2011), winner of the National Poetry Review Prize. He has also served as an editor for other works such as Language for a New Century (2008), which was hailed as "a beautiful achievement for world literature" by Nobel laureate in Literature Nadine Gordimer. He won a Rhode Island State Council on the Arts Individual Artist Fellowship in 2017  His translations with Priya Sarukkai Chabria of the 8th century Tamil poet/saint Andal won the 2016/2017 Muse India Translation Award at the Hyderabad Literary festival. He also appeared as a guest speaker at the Jaipur Literature Festival in January 2018.

His literary works appeared in Paris Review, Fulcrum, McSweeney's, the AWP Writer's Chronicle, and Scribner's Best American Erotic Poems. In 2014, he won Glenna Luschei Award from Prairie Schooner.

Controversies 
Shankar became the subject of several controversies during 2010. He won a settlement against the NYPD, after being racially profiled under the stop-and-frisk policies later found illegal by New York Superior Court Judge Shira Scheindlin, and appeared on NPR to discuss his wrongful arrest. He was later arrested and convicted in a few public cases including driving with a suspended license. He served 90 days in Hartford Correctional Center as a pretrial confinement, an experience which he wrote about in The Hartford Courant.

In 2013, Shankar resigned from teaching at Central Connecticut State University. to accept an International Research Fellowship at the University of Sydney, where he received his PhD from the University of Sydney researching the racial roots of mass incarceration and the genre of the prison memoir. He also filed multiple charges against the public university system of Central Connecticut and won a settlement of $60,409, paid by the college authority to Shankar, in exchange for his resignation. He has published a memoir about his experiences entitled  "Correctional," excerpts from which have been published in The New York Times, the Daily Beast, the Hartford Courant, The Common (magazine)  and the Michigan Quarterly Review.

Selected works

Memoir 
 Correctional, (University of Wisconsin Press, 2021)

Poetry 
 Instrumentality, Harper & Row, 2004, (WordTech Communications, 2004)
 Wanton Textiles, with Reb Livingston, (No Tell Books, 2006)
 Seamless Matter, with Sol LeWitt (Chapbook), OHM Editions – Rain Taxi, 2010
 Deepening Groove, (The National Poetry Review Press, 2011)
 What Else Could It Be: Ekphrastics and Collaborations, (Carolina Wren Press, 2015)
 Durable Transit: New and Selected Poems, (Poetrywala, 2018)
 Many Uses of Mint, (Recent Works Press, 2018)
 A Field Guide to Southern China with George Szirtes, (Eyewear Press, 2019)

Translations 
 The Autobiography of a Goddess, with Priya Sarukkai Chabria, Zubaan Books/University of Chicago Press, 2016

As editor 
 Language for a New Century: Contemporary Poetry from Asia, the Middle East & Beyond, with Tina Chang and Nathalie Handal, W. W. Norton & Company, 2008
 Radha Says: Final Poems of Reetika Vazirani, Drunken Boat Books, 2010
 UNION: 50 Years of Writing from Singapore and 15 Years of Drunken Boat, with Alvin Pang, Drunken Boat Media, 2015
 The Golden Shovel Anthology: New Poems Honoring Gwendolyn Brooks, with Patricia Smith and Peter Kahn, University of Arkansas Press, 2017
 Meridian: The APWT/Drunken Boat Anthology of New Writing, with Tim Tomlinson and Peter Kahn, Sally Breen, 2020

References

External links 
Drunken Boat, an Internet arts journal founded by Shankar
 Ravi Shankar at Poets Foundation
Shankar on Poetry Society of America's "Q-and-A on American Poetry"

1975 births
Living people
American male poets
American male writers of Indian descent
Indian emigrants to the United States
American magazine editors
American magazine founders
American people convicted of fraud
American people convicted of theft
Central Connecticut State University faculty
Columbia University School of the Arts alumni
People from Manassas, Virginia
Poets from Connecticut
English-language poets from India
Poets from Virginia
University of Virginia alumni
American male non-fiction writers
21st-century American poets
21st-century American male writers